The Olympic Sliding Centre Innsbruck is a venue for bobsleigh, luge and skeleton located in Igls, Austria (southeast of Innsbruck). The most recent version of the track was completed in 1975 and is the first permanent, combination artificially refrigerated bobsleigh, luge, and skeleton track, serving as a model for other tracks of its kind worldwide. It hosted the bobsleigh, luge, and skeleton competitions for the 2012 Winter Youth Olympics.

History
In 1935, Igls hosted the two-man event of the world bobsleigh championships when the track ran from Römerstrasses to the Patscherkofel valley railroad station. Several fatal accidents at the finishing curve occurred during competition, causing temporarily closure of the track until safety measures were introduced. In 1960, Innsbruck was awarded the 1964 Winter Olympics which led to the construction of separate bobsleigh and luge tracks for the games. Track construction began in September 1961 and was officially completed in July 1963 following test runs of both tracks, including twenty injuries during the 1963 FIBT World Championships on the bobsleigh track. Prior to the start of the 1964 Winter Olympics, British luger Kazimierz Kay-Skrzypeski was killed in a training run on the luge course. When Denver, Colorado, in the United States withdrew in 1972 after being awarded the 1976 Winter Olympics two years earlier for financial reasons, the International Olympic Committee offered the games to 1976 runner-up Whistler, British Columbia in Canada (northeast of Vancouver), but Whistler declined in the wake of the provincial elections in 1972. As a result, the IOC gave the games to Innsbruck. Construction on a new, combined track was started in 1973 under the auspices of the International Bobsleigh and Tobogganing Federation (FIBT) and the International Luge Federation (FIL) and completed the following year. The track was praised by the FIL during testing in 1975  and proved so successful that it fostered a commission with the FIBT and the FIL on construction of combination tracks in 1977 that continues to this day. (Known as homologation, an example of this dual certification process occurred prior to the 2006 Winter Olympics, when adjustments to the track at Cesana Pariol were made following FIL concerns about the run.) The track added a restaurant and was extended in 1981. In 1990–1, the ladies start house at the fifth turn was renovated and the finishing stretch was extended in 1998. The track was part of the OlympiaWorld-Innsbruck in 2004, the same year a general refurbishment was done on the concrete shell. Today, it serves as a training facility for new bobsledders and skeleton racers. It hosted the bobsleigh, luge, and skeleton events for the 2012 Winter Youth Olympics.

Statistics

The track has a vertical drop of 98.1 meters.

The 1964 Winter Olympic bobsleigh track, designed by former bobsledder and luger Paul Aste, consisted of 14 turns with a total length of 1506.36 meters, a vertical drop of 138 meters, and a maximum grade of 14.04%.

The 1964 Winter Olympic luge track, designed by former bobsledder and luger Paul Aste, consisted of 18 turns with a total length of 1063.76 meters for men singles and a vertical drop of 113.20 meters, and a maximum grade of 18.18%. For women's singles and men's doubles, the length was 910.00 meters with a vertical drop of 86.27 meters

Turns 1–3, 8-10, 14, and 15 have no names listed in the track diagram.

Championships hosted
1964 Winter Olympics
1976 Winter Olympics
2012 Winter Youth Olympics
FIBT World Championships: 1935 (two-man), 1963, 1991 (men's skeleton), 1993 (bobsleigh), 2000 (skeleton), 2016
FIL European Luge Championships: 1990
FIL World Luge Championships: 1977, 1987, 1997, 2007, 2017

See also
 Rodelbahn

References

External links
FIBT track profile - Click on video link for track. Luge - men's singles intersects with the bobsleigh & skeleton part of the track prior to turn one, then where luge - women's singles & men's doubles intersect with bobsleigh-skeleton prior to turn five.
FIL-Luge.org track profile
Official website 

Venues of the 1964 Winter Olympics
Venues of the 1976 Winter Olympics
Bobsleigh, luge, and skeleton tracks
Olympic bobsleigh venues
Olympic luge venues
Sports venues in Austria
Venues of the 2012 Winter Youth Olympics
Sports venues in Tyrol (state)